Elsie Adelaide McDonald (née Cawood), was a South African international lawn and indoor bowler.

Bowls career
She started bowling in 1958 for the Kimberley Engineering Works BC.

In 1969 she won the gold medal in the pairs with May Cridlan and the silver medal at the 1969 World Outdoor Bowls Championship in Sydney, Australia. She also won a gold medal in the team event (Taylor Trophy).

She was inaugurated into the South African Hall of Fame in 1981.

References

1920 births
2012 deaths
South African female bowls players
Bowls World Champions